The Wreath of Christ (Danish and Norwegian: Kristuskransen), also known as the Lutheran rosary, are a set of prayer beads developed in 1995 by Swedish Evangelical Lutheran bishop emeritus Martin Lönnebo. The Wreath of Christ contains 18 beads, which are known as "pearls", with many including a crucifix. They are an often used devotion in the Lutheran Church after their popularization through the text Pearls of Life; the Wreath of Christ has been used in ecumenical Christian settings as well.

Background
Bishop Lönnebo of the Lutheran Church of Sweden was stranded on an island in Greece for several days because of a storm. When he saw the Greek fishermen with their kombologia (which are in fact worry beads that have no religious or spiritual function), he was inspired to create the Wreath of Christ. He first developed, on paper, a set of Lutheran prayer beads where he gave all the pearls a specific meaning. After the return home to Sweden, he made the actual pearl ribbon, based on his sketches and started using it in his prayers. The devotion began to spread rapidly in Sweden and to other Lutheran countries.

Pearls
The order starts at the golden "God" bead and goes counter-clockwise. In this order, the pearls symbolise the course of life, and also represent a catechism.

The bead of God
The bead of Silence
The I bead
The bead of Baptism
The bead of Silence
The Desert bead
The bead of Silence
The Carefree bead
The bead of Silence
Bead of God's love
Bead of God's love
Bead of Secrets
Bead of Secrets
Bead of Secrets
The bead of Darkness
The bead of Silence
The bead of Resurrection
The bead of Silence
Crucifix

Prayers
The following prayers are said on the Wreath of Christ:

After these eighteen prayers, the Lord's Prayer is recited (either on the Golden Bead of God or on the crucifix).

References

External links
 rukoushelmet.net

Christian religious objects
Lutheran liturgy and worship
Prayer beads
1995 introductions